Florian Marc Jozefzoon (born 9 February 1991) is a professional footballer who plays as a winger for Eredivisie club RKC Waalwijk. Born in French Guiana, he represents the Suriname national team.

He is a product of the Ajax Youth Academy and won ten caps for the Netherlands at youth level. He has also won the Eredivisie with PSV Eindhoven in 2014–15 and 2015–16.

Club career

Ajax
A winger and attacking midfielder, Jozefzoon began his career with spells at CTO '70 and AFC. He joined the Ajax Youth Academy in 2006 and signed a three-year professional contract in June 2008. Jozefzoon won his maiden call into the first team squad for the opening match of the 2010–11 Eredivisie season versus FC Groningen and remained an unused substitute during the 2–2 draw. He made his senior debut six days later, replacing Urby Emanuelson at half time during a 4–2 win over SBV Vitesse. He scored his only goal for the club in a 5–0 KNVB Beker third round win over MVV Maastricht on 22 September 2010. After five appearances during the 2010–11 season, Jozefzoon signed a one-year contract extension in June 2011, but spent the 2011–12 season away on loan and was released at the end of the season.

NAC Breda (loan)
Jozefzoon spent the 2011–12 season on loan at Eredivisie club NAC Breda. He made 17 appearances and scored no goals during his spell.

RKC Waalwijk
On 25 May 2012, Jozefzoon joined Eredivisie club RKC Waalwijk on a free transfer, signing a two-year contract with an option for a third year. He made 36 appearances and scored seven goals during the 2012–13 season before departing the Mandemakers Stadion in June 2013.

PSV Eindhoven
In June 2013, Jozefzoon joined Eredivisie giants PSV Eindhoven for a €400,000 fee. Despite making 25 appearances and scoring four goals during his debut season, he failed to fully break into the first team at the Philips Stadion. Jozefzoon's 15 league appearances during the 2014–15 season were enough to win him an Eredivisie winners' medal, the first silverware of his career. After largely falling out of the first team picture through 2015 and 2016 due to an anterior cruciate ligament injury, however he won his second Eredivisie winners' medal during the 2015–16 Jozefzoon left the club in January 2017.

Brentford
On 27 January 2017, Jozefzoon moved to England to join Championship club Brentford for an undisclosed fee on a deal until the end of the 2016–17 season, with an option to extend for a further year. He made his debut four days later, playing the first 71 minutes of a 3–0 win over Aston Villa at Griffin Park. Jozefzoon scored his first Bees goal on his 16th appearance, with the equaliser in a 1–1 draw with Barnsley on 17 April. He finished the season with 19 appearances and the club extended his contract by two years.

Despite Sergi Canós suffering an injury, the signing of Ollie Watkins and the form of Josh Clarke meant that Jozefzoon failed to make the right wing berth his own during the early months of the 2017–18 season. Injury to Rico Henry in September saw Josh Clarke move to left back as cover, which allowed Jozefzoon to establish himself as a first choice wide option. He ended the 2017–18 season with 43 appearances and seven goals.

Derby County
After a £1.5 million bid from Derby County was rejected by Brentford on 4 July 2018, on 18 July, a follow-up bid of £2.75 million was accepted from Derby for the player. On 19 July, Brentford also accepted a matching rival bid for the player from Leeds United. He signed for Derby on 20 July 2018. He made his debut on 11 August in a 1–4 loss against Leeds United.

On 15 October 2020, he joined Rotherham United on loan for the remainder of the season.

On 14 June 2021, it was announced that he would leave Derby at the end of the season, following the expiry of his contract.

Quevilly-Rouen
He signed for French club Quevilly-Rouen in September 2021.

Return to RKC Waalwijk
After a successful trial, Jozefzoon returned to his former club RKC Waalwijk on 4 August 2022, signing a one-year contract.

International career
Jozefzoon won ten caps for the Netherlands at U19 and U21 level. He was part of the Netherlands squads at the 2010 European U19 Championship and 2013 European U21 Championship finals.

Jozefzoon was called up to the Suriname squad for the first time in March 2021. He scored on his debut in a 6–0 win over Aruba. In June 2021 Josefzoon was named to the Suriname squad for the 2021 CONCACAF Gold Cup.

Personal life
Jozefzoon was born in Saint-Laurent-du-Maroni, French Guiana and moved with his Surinamese parents, six brothers and two sisters to the Netherlands at age two.

Career statistics

Club

International

Scores and results list Suriname's goal tally first, score column indicates score after each Jozefzoon goal.

Honours
Ajax
 Eredivisie: 2010–11

PSV
 Eredivisie: 2014–15, 2015–16

References

1991 births
Living people
People from Saint-Laurent-du-Maroni
Surinamese footballers
Suriname international footballers
Dutch footballers
Netherlands youth international footballers
Netherlands under-21 international footballers
Dutch sportspeople of Surinamese descent
French Guianan footballers
French Guianan people of Surinamese descent
French emigrants to the Netherlands
Naturalised citizens of the Netherlands
AFC Ajax players
NAC Breda players
RKC Waalwijk players
PSV Eindhoven players
Eredivisie players
Association football wingers
Brentford F.C. players
Derby County F.C. players
Rotherham United F.C. players
Dutch expatriate footballers
Surinamese expatriate footballers
Dutch expatriate sportspeople in England
Surinamese expatriates in England
Expatriate footballers in England
Amsterdamsche FC players
English Football League players
2021 CONCACAF Gold Cup players
US Quevilly-Rouen Métropole players
Dutch expatriate sportspeople in France
Surinamese expatriates in France
Expatriate footballers in France
Ligue 2 players